Spanish Cay Airport  is an airstrip serving Spanish Cay, one of the Abaco Islands in The Bahamas.

Facilities

References

Airports in the Bahamas
Abaco Islands